Franz Wilhelmer (born 29 July 1960) is an Austrian luger who competed in the early 1980s. He is best known for finishing second three times in the men's doubles overall Luge World Cup (1981-2, 1983-4, 1984-5).

Wilhemer also finished fourth in the men's doubles event at the 1984 Winter Olympics in Sarajevo.

References

External links
1984 luge men's doubles results
List of men's doubles luge World Cup champions since 1978.

1960 births
Living people
Austrian male lugers
Lugers at the 1980 Winter Olympics
Lugers at the 1984 Winter Olympics
Olympic lugers of Austria